Jeffrey Allen Boschee (born on December 21, 1979) is an American former basketball player and current coach. He currently serves as head coach of the men's team at Pittsburg State University in Pittsburg, Kansas. He was formerly the head coach at Missouri Southern State University in Joplin, Missouri.  Boschee played guard at the University of Kansas from 1998 to 2002. He was named Mr. Basketball for North Dakota in 1998.

Playing career

High school career
After a successful career at Valley City High School, Boschee was named a Parade Magazine All-American, USA Today Top 25 selection, and played in the McDonald's All-American game.

College career
Boschee was a four-year starter at Kansas under former KU coach Roy Williams from 1998 to 2002. While at KU he won a conference championship and a conference tournament championship, and played in the 2002 NCAA Final Four. He was voted freshman of the year, and was named 3rd Team All-Big 12 as a senior. He is first all-time at KU in three-point field goals made and second all-time in games started. He once held the Big 12 career record for 3-pointers with 338, but on January 31, 2009, this was eclipsed by Texas's A. J. Abrams.

Professional career
After his final season at Kansas, Boschee enrolled in some classes to finish his degree in sports management as well as playing for the practice squad. After graduating in the spring of 2003, he signed with Kansas Cagerz of the United States Basketball League for the last 10 games of the season where he averaged 9.2 points a game. He returned to the Cagerz the following season and averaged 13.2 points per game.

In August 2004, he signed with Panellinios B.C. in Greece. During training camp, he sprained his ankle and missed three weeks. In October, he was further diagnosed with cysts growing on both his hip sockets, with the left one leaking fluid into his hip and was subsequently released by the club. He returned to the United States and signed with Kansas City Knights of the American Basketball Association. In February 2005, he signed with Grindavík of the Icelandic Úrvalsdeild karla. He appeared in six regular season games, averaging 17.0 points and 4.0 assist per game. In the playoffs, Grindavík lost in the first round against eventual champions Keflavík in three games where Boschee averaged a team high 22.3 points and 3.3 assists per game.

Coaching career
Boschee is a former assistant coach at Blue Valley Northwest High School located in Overland Park, Kansas. He was the head boys' basketball coach at The Barstow School in Kansas City, Missouri. Barstow concluded its 2007–08 season with a 20–5 record, the third-best mark in school history. In his second season as Barstow's varsity coach, Boschee's team finished with a 22–4 record. Boschee's third Barstow team completed the 2009–10 season with a 22–5 mark.

On May 13, 2010, it was announced that Boschee has joined the coaching staff of Div. II Missouri Southern State University, in Joplin, Missouri.

On March 29, 2014, it was announced that Boschee was promoted to head coach at Missouri Southern from assistant coach.

On March 9, 2022, Boschee was announced as the 16th head coach at Pittsburg State, also in the MIAA.

Statistics

1999–2000

1999–2000 Season totals

Season averages

Head coaching record

References

External links
College statistics at sports-reference.com
Jeff Boschee at eurobasket.com
NBA 2002 draft profile at nba.com
RealGM Profile at realgm.com
Úrvalsdeild statistics at kki.is

1979 births
Living people
American men's basketball players
Basketball coaches from North Dakota
American expatriate basketball people in Greece
American expatriate basketball people in Iceland
Basketball players from North Dakota
College men's basketball head coaches in the United States
Grindavík men's basketball players
Kansas Jayhawks men's basketball players
Kansas City Knights players
McDonald's High School All-Americans
Missouri Southern Lions men's basketball coaches
Panellinios B.C. players
Parade High School All-Americans (boys' basketball)
People from Valley City, North Dakota
Pittsburg State Gorillas men's basketball coaches
Point guards
Úrvalsdeild karla (basketball) players